Schrödinger's cat is a thought experiment.

Schrödinger's cat may also refer to:
 Schrödinger's Cat Trilogy, a set of novels by American writer Robert Anton Wilson 
 Schrödinger's Cat, code-name for a version of the Fedora Linux distribution
 In Search of Schrödinger's Cat,  a 1984 book on quantum theory by John Gribbin
 Schrödingers katt, Norwegian TV series 1990–2016

See also 
 Schrödinger's cat in popular culture
 Schrödinger's paradox (disambiguation)